653rd Regional Support Group is a United States Army Reserve unit which controls Combat Sustainment Support Battalions and Quartermaster units within Arizona and California.

Units
The brigade is made up of the following units:
 653rd Command Support Group Headquarters and Headquarters Detachment
 419th Combat Sustainment Support Battalion
 419th Headquarters and Headquarters Company (CSS) 
 163rd Transportation Company (AMMO) (Mission Operations Directorate) 
 340th Transportation Detachment (Movement Control)(Area) 
 478th Transportation Company (Medium Truck)(Palletized Load System) 
 968th Transportation Company (Water Purification & Distribution) 
 1017th Transportation Company (Petrol Support) 
 336th Combat Sustainment Support Battalion
 336th Headquarters and Headquarters Battalion (CSS) 
 348th Transportation Company (Medium Truck) (POL, 5K GAL)(Echelons above corps) 
 289th Transportation Detachment (Trailer Transfer Platoon)  
 452nd Quartermaster Company (Field Services)(Mission Operations Directorate) 
 974th Transportation Detachment (Movement Control)(Area)  
 418th Quartermaster Battalion
 418th Headquarters and Headquarters Battalion (Petrol Support) 
 208th Quartermaster Company (Medium Truck)(Palletized Load System)  
 331st Quartermaster Detachment (MCT)
 312th Adjutant General Company (HR)

References

Support groups of the United States Army